The Primetime Emmy Award for Outstanding Interactive Program is presented to integrated interactive experiences for linear television programming. According to Emmy rules, this includes "excellence in the combined, overall interactive media execution for an existing program or series, containing programming and features that extend the program experience beyond passive viewing, often across multiple platforms." Examples include behind-the-scenes content, commentary, story and character extensions, and social audience interaction or input that drives the program forward.

In 2017, Primetime Emmy Award categories were renamed and reclassified.  Outstanding Original Interactive Program honors work not related to an existing television program or series. Outstanding Creative Achievement in Interactive Media within a Scripted Program and Outstanding Creative Achievement in Interactive Media within a Unscripted Program recognize interactive experiences for both scripted TV and documentary, nonfiction, reality and reality-competition programs. Outstanding Innovation in Interactive Programming encourages pioneering interactive experiences, based on "exceptional distinctiveness, inventiveness, and relevance of the submitted work in expanding and redefining the conventions of interactive media experiences."

Listed below are winners and nominees for all interactive media categories. Outstanding Creative Achievement in Interactive Media awards were bestowed for multiplatform storytelling, social TV experience, and user experience/visual design.

Winners and nominations

2000s

2010s

2020s

References

Interactive Program